Dinjapyx rossi is a species of two-pronged bristletail in the family Dinjapygidae.

References

Diplura
Articles created by Qbugbot
Animals described in 1959